The Shoppes at Rivers Crossing is a super regional lifestyle center located in Macon, Georgia. It was developed by General Growth Properties as a response to the declining area around the older Macon Mall. Phase I opened March 19, 2008, while phase II opened shortly after. Belk and Dillard's opened their second Macon-area stores at River Crossing in 2008; however, Dillard's closed its old Macon Mall location later in 2008 and Belk closed its old Macon Mall location in 2012, leaving the new mall River Crossing stores as the only ones in Macon. The Shoppes at River Crossing has become known as "The New Mall" to Macon residents.

Anchors
Belk (132,000 square feet)
Dillard's (200,000 square feet)

Junior anchors
 Barnes & Noble  (60,000 square feet)
 Dick's Sporting Goods (60,000 square feet)
 Jo-Ann Fabrics & Crafts (20,000 square feet)

References

Shopping malls established in 2008
Brookfield Properties
Shopping malls in Georgia (U.S. state)
Buildings and structures in Macon, Georgia
Tourist attractions in Macon, Georgia
2008 establishments in Georgia (U.S. state)